Graham Lancashire (born 19 October 1970, Blackpool) is a former professional footballer who played as a striker. He spent most of his career in the north-west of England.

Playing career
Lancashire progressed through the youth ranks with Burnley, who he made his Football League debut for in the 1990–91 season The following season saw him net nine league and one cup goal as Burnley won the Division Four championship with one league goal being expunged after Aldershot Towns resignation from the league. But he made just four more league appearances for them after this.

He spent time on loan with Halifax Town in 1992–93 and then had a memorable temporary spell with Chester City in the closing stages of the following season. He scored seven times in 11 appearances to help clinch promotion for the Blues, including a last-gasp winner against promotion rivals Preston North End in April 1994. Lancashire was recalled to Burnley shortly before the season ended and was an unused substitute in their play-off final victory over Stockport County at Wembley Stadium.

Lancashire moved to Preston for £55,000 in December 1994, but was to make just six appearances when the club won the Division Three title the following season. In April 1996 he was transferred for £35,000 to Wigan Athletic, where he had played on loan in the previous months scoring 3 goals in 4 games. Unfortunately he had another knee injury in his first match after signing for them full-time, away at Lincoln City. He managed to be fit for the start of the following season and was once more involved in another Division Three promotion campaign, as despite injury problems (yet another long-term knee injury) he found the net nine times in Wigan's championship season and struck up a prolific partnership with Graeme Jones. However, once more his opportunities would be limited after promotion and he joined Rochdale for £40,000 in October 1997. He played at Spotland for four years but had numerous soft tissue injuries that kept him out of the team on many occasions, never stringing a sustained number of matches together, before leaving at the end of the 2000–01 season. This marked the end of Lancashire's professional career, as he joined non-league side Hednesford Town.

Since ending his playing days, Lancashire has been involved in organising football-related events for the organisation SpeedMark.
Now working as an Intermediary for DRN Sports and Assistant Manager at Lancaster City.

Honours
Burnley

• Football League Division Four Champions: 1991–92 (25 apps, 8 goals)

• Football League Division Two promotion as play-off winners: 1993–94 (unused sub in play-off final)

Chester City

• Football League Division Three runners-up: 1993–94 (11 apps, 7 goals)

Preston North End

• Football League Division Three champions: 1995–96 (6 apps, 2 goals)

Wigan Athletic

• Football League Division Three champions: 1996–97 (24 apps, 9 goals)

References

Currently working as Academy Operations Manager at Burnley FC.

External links

Burnley career stats

Sources

1972 births
Sportspeople from Blackpool
Living people
English footballers
Association football forwards
English Football League players
Burnley F.C. players
Halifax Town A.F.C. players
Chester City F.C. players
Preston North End F.C. players
Wigan Athletic F.C. players
Rochdale A.F.C. players
Hednesford Town F.C. players
Burnley F.C. non-playing staff